Good Luck! is an Indian film directed by Aditya Datt and produced jointly by Karan Sharma and Jagdish Sharma. The film stars Aryeman Ramsay and Sayali Bhagat in the lead roles with Lucky Ali and Ranvir Shorey appear in supporting roles. It is inspired by Hollywood film, Just My Luck. The film was released on 8 August 2008.

Synopsis

This is a story about a singer/dancer Vicky Verma (Aryeman Ramsay). While he was a top student in his school and college days, he is not having much luck finding work, clients or projects. All he does seems to go wrong. Afterwards, Saba (Sayali Bhagat) one of the most luckiest girls in the city, meets Vicky at a masked-party and the two kiss which swaps their luck around. Vicky gets as lucky as hell, and Saba gets jinxed. After she finds out that her luck changed due to that kiss, Saba goes out looking for Vicky even though she has never seen his face because he was wearing a mask at the party when they kissed. Vicky gets signed a contract deal by Tarun Chopra (Lucky Ali), but its later cancelled when Saba finds him and kisses him to get the luck back. She goes to work, only to get fired, knowing that Vicky was going to use the luck not on him but on his little cousin who has a heart-problem. She once again kisses him to give him the luck back, and Vicky kisses his little cousin and she gets all the luck. After he does that, he ends up winning Saba's love and admiration. After Saba and Vicky get together, Vicky and Saba's life's change and they become prosperous.

Songs
"Good Luck" - Sunidhi Chauhan, Adnan Sami
"Good Luck" (club mix) - Sunidhi Chauhan, Adnan Sami
"Main Sajda" - Shilpa Rao, Sukhwinder Singh
"Main Sajda" V2 - Shilpa Rao, Sukhwinder Singh
"Nazar Mein Hai Chehra" - Lucky Ali, Vasundhara Das
"Nazar Mein Hai Chehra" (hip hop mix) - Lucky Ali, Vasundhara Das
"Soniya Aaja Ni" - Krishna Beura
"Soniya Aaja Ni" (club mix) - Krishna Beura

Cast

 Aryeman Ramsay as Vicky Varma; a jinxed 25-year-old singer looking for a contract deal
 Sayali Bhagat as Saba; a charmed hard-worker
 Lucky Ali as Tarun Chopra; a rich musical contract dealer
 Ranvir Shorey as Javed; a Jig lo
 Nazneen Patel as Kanchan Soni
 Archana Puran Singh in special appearance 
 Sharat Saxena in special appearance
 Viju Khote in special appearance

External links
BollywoodHungama Entry

2008 films
Films scored by Anu Malik
2000s Hindi-language films